The Adventures of Mimi  was a 2006 concert tour of arenas by American singer-songwriter Mariah Carey. It was one of a few tours in her then-sixteen-year career and was named after a fan's "Carey-centric" diary of the same name. The bus tour started in late July and ended in October, with two stops in Africa, twenty-five stops in the United States, seven in Canada, and seven in Asia. At the end of 2006, the tour placed 24th on Pollstar's "Top 100 Tours", earning $27.9 million with 32 shows from the North American leg.

Background 
Unlike her previous tour, three years prior, Carey started this tour 16 months after the release of her latest album, the successful The Emancipation of Mimi. She had initially not wanted to tour, dreading the long travel times and not needing one to promote Mimi. But after requests from fans to appear in concert, she decided to do so to celebrate one of the best times in her career.

Similar to the past tour, Carey gave her fans the chance to submit their ideas for set lists and for the title of the tour. Her long-time musical partner and American Idol judge Randy Jackson joined her tour as the musical director, although he did not often appear at shows due to concurrent Idol auditions.

During the tour, Carey revamped her image as a performer, performing remixes of her songs, dancing along a bit with her dancers, having guests onstage, and going into the middle of each arena onto a checkerboard B-stage to perform "Fantasy", "Always Be My Baby" and "Don't Forget About Us." (The B stage had become an increasing popular way for large-venue performers to get closer to their audience ever since U2 introduced it on their 1992 Zoo TV Tour.) The main stage was a two-level affair, with the band situated on the lower level, backed by strands of glittering material, and a staircase between the two. Carey's "MC" logo was present in several places.

Once again, Carey invited her long-time friend and back-up singer Trey Lorenz to sing "I'll Be There" and "One Sweet Day" with her and perform several songs on his own during one of her costume changes. Except for an occasional guest appearance, raps on her songs were the pre-recorded originals, with the rapper shown on the video screens.

Critical reception 
Reviews of the tour were generally positive. Most critics celebrated Carey's transformation from a pop star to a full-fledged hip hop artist. They also praised her vocal performances saying that was the main attraction of the spectacle.

Some critics commented on the short length of the show, especially given that she was offstage for several breaks while undergoing costume changes, while others felt Carey was trying too hard to make the public like her, especially in terms of the "rollercoaster" metaphor she used to begin the show.

Recordings 
According to Carey's musical director Randy Jackson, the show at Honda Center in Anaheim on October 8, 2006 was intended as the basis for a concert filming and subsequent DVD release.
Indeed, Carey held a pre-concert taping there, in order to include fans, regulate the lighting, and review other technical aspects in preparation for the night's actual concert recording.

The resulting DVD, called The Adventures of Mimi, was released over a year later, beginning in Europe on November 19, 2007, with releases in other regions of the world coming over the following two weeks.

Set list 

 "Rollercoaster" (Video introduction)
 "It's Like That" (With elements of "Sucker MC's" and "Hollis Crew" by Run-DMC)
 "Heartbreaker" (With elements of "Desert Storm Remix")
 "Dreamlover" (With elements of "Juicy" by The Notorious B.I.G.)
 "My All"
 "Shake It Off"
"Vision of Love"
 "Fly Like a Bird"
 "I'll Be There" 
 "My Everything" (Performed by Trey Lorenz)
 "Fantasy" 
 "Don't Forget About Us"
 "Always Be My Baby"
 "Honey" (With elements of "Bad Boy Remix")
 "I Wish You Knew" (Snippet)
 "Thank God I Found You" (Make It Last Remix) [With Trey Lorenz]
 "One Sweet Day" (With Trey Lorenz)
 "Hero"
 "We Belong Together"
 "Fly Away (Butterfly Reprise)" 

Notes:

 "Breakdown" was performed in Tunis and Miami.
 "I Know What You Want" was performed in Tunis, Miami and Tampa.
 "I Wish You Knew" was not performed in Tunis.
 "Make It Happen" was performed in Tunis, Miami, Tampa, Atlanta, Philadelphia, Toronto, Montreal, on the first Atlantic City show, Boston, New York City, Anaheim and Calgary.
 "Without You" was performed in Tunis.
 "Vision of Love" was replaced by "Stay the Night" in Miami, Tampa, Atlanta, Uncasville, Albany, Verona, Tokyo, Nagoya and on the first Saitama show.
 "Your Girl" was performed in Miami, Atlanta, Albany, Wantagh and Verona.
 A snippet of "Can't Let Go" was performed in Tampa, Atlanta, Philadelphia, Toronto, Montreal, on the first Atlantic City show, Boston, New York City, East Rutherford, Washington DC, Auburn Hills, Houston, Dallas, Winnipeg, Edmonton, Las Vegas, Oakland, Los Angeles, Anaheim and Phoenix.
 A snippet of "Joy Ride" was performed in Tampa.
 "One Sweet Day" was not performed in Tampa, on the second Atlantic City show, Verona, Tokyo, Nagoya, Saitama and Osaka.
 "Thank God I Found You" was not performed in Atlanta, on the second Atlantic City show, Uncasville, Albany, Verona, Washington DC, Seattle, Calgary, Sacramento, Anaheim and during the Asian leg.
 A snippet of "Close My Eyes" was performed in Toronto, Montreal and Wantagh.
 Da Brat and JAY Z joined Carey on stage for the performance of "Heartbreaker" in New York City.
 Diddy joined Carey on stage for the performance of "Honey" in New York City.
 "Let Me Love You" was performed by Mario in East Rutherford.
 Mario joined Carey on stage for the performance of "One Sweet Day" in East Rutherford.
 "Fantasy" was not performed in Wantagh.
 "Fly Like a Bird" was not performed in Verona, Tokyo, Nagoya, on the first Saitama show and Osaka.
 A snippet of "Melt Away" was performed in Auburn Hills.
 A snippet of "Love Takes Time" was performed in Winnipeg.
 A snippet of "My Saving Grace" was performed in San Diego.
 Da Brat joined Carey on stage for the performance of "Heartbreaker" in Los Angeles.
 "All I Want for Christmas Is You" was performed during the Asian leg.
 "My All" was not performed on the first Saitama show.

Shows 

Additional Notes
 Carey never schedules shows in two consecutive nights, as she "actually [has] to have a full day and a half off between shows, whereas most touring artists do it every night", and she spends her down time preserving her voice by not talking and "sitting in a humidified room, sleeping."
 Carey performed a show at the Kodak Theatre in Los Angeles on July 29, 2006 as part of the Pepsi Smash concert series. These tickets were not available to the public. Only winners selected through an online contest. The show featured the same stage setting but a shortened setlist with some different costumes.

Cancelled shows

Personnel

Main 
Manager — Mariah Carey & Benny Medina
Co-Manager — Mark Sudack
Tour Manager — Michael Richardson
Show Director — Barry Lather
Musical Director — Randy Jackson
Tour Executive — Michael Richardson
Handprint Entertainment — Melissa Ruderman
Maroon Entertainment — Gina Rainville
Lighting/Set Design — Justin Collie/Art Fag
Sound Design — Mike McKnight
Sound Engineer — Howard Page
Video Director — Chris Keating
Backline Tech — Shawn Atkins Drums & Bass guitar/Key Bass
Vignettes — Directed by Spike Lee
Frefall Intro — Bill Boatman & Michael Shores
Security: Darrel Clark and Rob Payne
Make-Up & Hair — Paul Starr and Lew Ablahani

Costume Designer — June Ambrose
Dressmaker — Cmylo
Personal Assistant — Lisa Ripi
Personal Trainer — Patricia Gay
Choreography — Rachel McIntosh, Eddie Morales, Anthony Talauega, Richmond Talauega, and AJ Jones
Dancers — Rachel McIntosh, Eddie Morales, Earl Wright, Joshuah Michael, Michelle Brooke, Bryan Tanaka, Russel Wright, Rafael Mello Alvim, and Myles Anthony Urquhart

Band 
Keyboards — Eric Daniels and Lamonte Neuble
Drums — Jerohn Garnett
Bass & Keyboards — James Butler
Background vocalists — Trey Lorenz, MaryAnn Tatum and Sherry Tatum
Choir – Greater Los Angeles Cathedral Choir

Notes

References

External links 

Mariah Carey concert tours
2006 concert tours